Harati High School is located in Esfahan, Iran. The school is regarded as a well-known landmark. It is located on Kamal Esmaeel Avenue (or Boulevard) between the Khadjoo and the 33 pol bridges.

References

High schools in Iran
Schools in Isfahan